Scan Furniture was a co-operative furniture chain that sold modern Scandinavian furniture that operated six stores in the metropolitan Baltimore-Washington, D.C. area.

Unusually, it was founded in 1938 as a grocery store in Greenbelt, Maryland, which became the Greenbelt Cooperative in 1940.  The cooperative grew to include a gas station and furniture store. In 1984, the board of directors sold the grocery store and gas operations to concentrate on its Scan division.  The grocery store remains a cooperative called the Greenbelt Consumers Cooperative.

In 1978 Scan Furniture was the largest teak importer in the country and imported about $10 million of teak every year. It was based in Rockville, Maryland, with a distribution center in Columbia.

On December 19, 2007, Scan filed for Chapter 11 bankruptcy protection, according to a report in the Baltimore Business Journal. Its sales dropped $25 million to $17 million from 2005 to 2007, according to court papers filed in the U.S. Bankruptcy Court in Baltimore. The retailer cited declining revenue and an inability to borrow money as factors in its filing.

References

External links 
 The Greenbelt Cooperative: Success and Decline
 Scan Furniture website—(now defunct)

Furniture retailers of the United States
Former cooperatives of the United States
Greenbelt, Maryland
Companies based in Rockville, Maryland
American companies established in 1960
Retail companies established in 1960
Retail companies disestablished in 2007
1960 establishments in Maryland
2007 disestablishments in Maryland
Defunct companies based in Maryland